is a professional Go player.

Biography 
Ishii became an insei in 1954, then a professional in 1956 under the guidance of his teacher Hokosawa Senjin. By 1978, he was at the highest rank of order, 9 dan. Although he competed in countless tournaments during his time, he was never able to win any. He is the teacher of Iyama Yuta.

Promotion record

Past runners-up

External links
Profile (Japanese)
GoBase Profile

1941 births
Japanese Go players
Living people